Tales from the Crypt Presents: Ritual is a 2002 American horror comedy film and third and final film based on the HBO television series Tales from the Crypt, following Demon Knight and Bordello of Blood. The film was released in select countries in 2002, the Philippines in 2003, and released direct-to-DVD in the US in 2006. It stars Tim Curry, Jennifer Grey, and Craig Sheffer with Avi Nesher directing. It is based on the film I Walked With a Zombie.

Plot

Crypt Keeper intro
The Crypt Keeper is in Jamaica wearing his hair in "deadlocks" as he states that one of his favorite things about Jamaica are the "eye-popping honeys" as it shows different bikini-clad women that are nearby. He then talks about how he just finished wrapping up his new movie in Jamaica. He introduces the movie and tells them "Don't worry, the beast is yet to come".

Story
Dr. Alice Dodgson (Jennifer Grey) is fired from a hospital due to her involvement in the death of a patient. With few options, she decides to take a job as a nurse in Jamaica caring for Wesley Claybourne (Daniel Lapaine), a young man apparently suffering from encephalitis. Alice falls in love with Wesley, but she fears that she and Wesley are the targets of a voodoo cult.

She befriends Caro (Kristen Wilson), a local girl. Caro advises Alice that any recrimination from the Voodoo community will only come as a result of her interference with their practices. Tension mounts as Alice suffers additional unexplained phenomena.

Caro is revealed as the cause of the strange goings-on; she is seeking revenge against Wesley because their father Paul (Craig Sheffer) killed Caro's mother and rejected Caro as his daughter, denying her an inheritance. Caro attempts to paralyze Alice and turn her into a zombie, but Alice is only partially paralyzed. Alice causes Caro's plan to backfire, and Caro is turned into a zombie instead.

Alice and Wesley abandon Jamaica and move back to the United States. The local Police Chief takes Caro into his home and puts her in his bed.

In the post-credits, there are bloopers of the Crypt Keeper's intro as the credits are shown.

Cast
 Jennifer Grey as Dr. Alice Dodgson
 Craig Sheffer as Paul Claybourne
 Daniel Lapaine as Wesley Claybourne
 Kristen Wilson as Caro Lamb
 Gabriel Casseus as J.B.
 Tim Curry as Matthew Hope
 Ron Taylor as Superintendent Archibald
 Erick Avari as Dr. Peter Winsford
 Dorothy Cunningham as Violette
 Kathy Owen as Dr. Shaba
 Jessica Collins as Jackie
 Stephen Tobolowsky as Dr. Javitz
 Natasha Budhi as Dori
 John Kassir as The Voice of The Crypt Keeper

Production
A third Crypt film was planned on the release of Bordello of Blood, but due to the low box office take of that film, this film's references to the Tales from the Crypt franchise and Crypt Keeper intro and credits were removed until the DVD release.

Release
Ritual was originally released for foreign countries in 2002. The film saw release in the Philippines on September 18, 2002, and was also released in Japan on January 25, 2006. It was not released in the United States until May 2, 2006 on DVD. It was later released on Blu-ray in the United States on December 4, 2012.

References

External links
 

2002 films
2002 horror films
2006 films
2006 horror films
American comedy horror films
Tales from the Crypt films
Films directed by Avi Nesher
Films scored by Shirley Walker
American zombie comedy films
Dimension Films films
Films produced by Walter Hill
2000s English-language films
2000s American films